Katherine Lewis may refer to:
 Katherine Reynolds Lewis, American journalist and author
 Katherine Scanlon Lewis (born 1970), American rower

See also
 Cathy Lewis (1916–1968), American actress